The 8.8 cm SK C/31 was a German naval gun that was used in World War II.

Description
It used a vertical sliding-block breech design. The Dopp LC/31 mount was later modified to carry the 10.5 cm SK C/33 naval gun. Useful life expectancy was fairly short 1,500 effective full charges (EFC) per barrel. The 8.8 cm SK C/31 was briefly deployed on the Cruiser Lutzow. Lutzow's anti-aircraft battery originally consisted of three 8.8 cm SK L/45 naval guns, though in 1935 these were replaced with six 8.8 cm SK C/31 guns and in 1940, the 8.8 cm guns were removed, and six 10.5 cm L/65 guns were fitted.

Ammunition
Ammunition Types Available:
 High Explosive (HE) - 
 Illumination (ILLUM) -

See also
 List of naval guns

Footnotes
Notes

Citations

References

External links
 SK C/31 at Navweaps.com

88 mm artillery
Naval guns of Germany
Naval anti-aircraft guns